The Underwood Typewriter Company was an American manufacturer of typewriters headquartered in New York City, with manufacturing facilities in Hartford, Connecticut. Underwood produced what is considered the first widely successful, modern typewriter. By 1939, Underwood had produced five million machines.

History

From 1874, the Underwood family made typewriter ribbon and carbon paper, and were among a number of firms who produced these goods for Remington. When Remington decided to start producing ribbons themselves, the Underwoods opted to manufacture typewriters.

The original Underwood typewriter was invented by German-American Franz Xaver Wagner, who showed it to entrepreneur John Thomas Underwood. Underwood supported Wagner and bought the company, recognizing the importance of the machine.

The Underwood Number 5 launched in 1900 has been described as "the first truly modern typewriter." Two million of these typewriters had been sold by the early 1920s, and its sales “were equal in quantity to all of the other firms in the typewriter industry combined.” When the company was in its heyday as the world's largest typewriter manufacturer, its factory in Hartford, Connecticut was turning out typewriters at the rate of one each minute and, along with Royal Typewriter Company, made Hartford the “Typewriter Capitol of the World”.

Philip Dakin Wagoner was appointed president of the Elliott-Fisher Company after World War I (1914-1918).
Elliott-Fisher became the parent of the Underwood Typewriter Company and the Sundstrand Adding Machine Co.
In 1927 Wagoner reorganized the company into Underwood-Elliott-Fisher, which later became the Underwood Corporation. The reorganization was completed in December 1927. John Thomas Underwood was elected chairman and Wagoner president of Underwood Elliott-Fisher.

In the years before World War II, Underwood built the worlds' largest typewriter in an attempt to promote itself. The typewriter was on display at Garden Pier in Atlantic City, New Jersey, for several years and attracted large crowds. Often, Underwood would have a young woman sitting on each of the large keys. The enormous typewriter was scrapped for metal when the war started.

During World War II, Underwood produced M1 carbines. Approximately 540,000 M1 carbines were produced from late 1942 to May 1944. Underwood also produced M1 carbine barrels for the U.S. government. Under the Free Issue Barrel Program, barrels were sent to other prime manufacturers who did not possess the machines to make barrels.

In 1945 Wagoner was elected chairman of the board of Underwood, and Leon C. Stowell was elected president.
Wagoner remained chief executive.
Olivetti bought a controlling interest in Underwood in 1959, and completed the merger in October 1963, becoming known in the U.S. as Olivetti-Underwood with headquarters in New York City, and entering the electromechanical calculator business.  The Underwood brand appears in 2021 on some cash registers produced by Olivetti.

Notable users 
Some writers who had endorsed with Underwood typewriters such as William Faulkner, F. Scott Fitzgerald, Ernest Hemingway and Robert E. Howard.

Gallery

References

External links 

1895 establishments in New York City
American companies established in 1895
Manufacturing companies established in 1895
1959 mergers and acquisitions
1963 disestablishments in New York (state)
American companies disestablished in 1963
Manufacturing companies disestablished in 1963
Typewriters
Olivetti S.p.A.
Defunct manufacturing companies based in New York City